Barp Gewog (Dzongkha: བརཔ་) is a gewog (village block) of Punakha District, Bhutan.

References

Gewogs of Bhutan
Punakha District